Taggart Lake is located in Grand Teton National Park, in the U. S. state of Wyoming. The natural lake is located at the terminus of Avalanche Canyon.  A number of hiking trails can be found near the lake including a  roundtrip hike commencing from the Taggart Lake Trailhead parking area. The lake is approximately one mile south of Bradley Lake reckoned by trail distance. A 2005 study of the water quality of the lakes in Grand Teton National Park indicated that the lakes in the park were still considered pristine and that they had not been impacted by air or water pollution.

Taggart lake was named after William Rush Taggart, an assistant surveyor to Frank Bradley as part of the Snake River division of the Hayden expedition of 1872 to document the geology and topography of the Yellowstone area.

Other lakes in the area were named after the below individuals:
 Bradley Lake - Frank Bradley
 Taggart Lake - William Rush Taggart
 Leigh Lake - Beaver Dick Leigh
 Jenny Lake - Jenny Leigh (his wife)
 Phelps Lake - George Phelps (a hunter)

See also
Geology of the Grand Teton area

References

Lakes of Grand Teton National Park